A list of films released in Japan in 1977 (see 1977 in film).

Box-office ranking

List of films

See also
1977 in Japan
1977 in Japanese television

Notes

References

External links
 

1977
Lists of 1977 films by country or language
Films